A13 or A-13 may refer to:

Biology 
 ATC code A13 Tonics, a subgroup of the Anatomical Therapeutic Chemical Classification System
 British NVC community A13 (Potamogeton perfoliatus - Myriophyllum alterniflorum community)
 Subfamily A13, a rhodopsin-like receptors subfamily

Transportation
 A13 road, in several countries
 Archambault A13, a French sailboat design
 Antonov A-13, a 1958 Soviet acrobatic sailplane
 Chery A13, a subcompact car
 , a British A-class submarine of the Royal Navy
 A-13 (tank), the General Staff specification covering three British cruiser tanks designed and built before and during the Second World War
 Cruiser Mk III
 Cruiser Mk IV
 Covenanter tank

Other uses 
 A13, one of the Encyclopaedia of Chess Openings codes for the English Opening in chess
 Apple A13, a system on a chip mobile processor designed by Apple
 Samsung Galaxy A13, a smartphone manufactured by Samsung Electronics